NCI can stand for:

 Non-controlling interest (Minority interest), in accounting, minority ownership in a subsidiary corporation
 National Cancer Institute, American medical research agency
 National Captioning Institute, American non-profit organization providing captioning for film and TV
 National Computational Infrastructure National Facility (Australia), Australia’s national research computing service
 National College of Ireland, college in Dublin, Ireland
 Native Communications, Inc., Aboriginal public broadcasting service in Manitoba, Canada
 National Coastwatch Institution, UK voluntary coastwatch organisation
 North Coast Institute of TAFE, university system in New South Wales, Australia
 Negative chemical ionization, chemical technique used in mass spectrometry
 Noarlunga Centre railway station, a railway station in Adelaide, Australia
 nCi, abbreviation for nanocurie, a unit of radioactivity
 Noi con l'Italia ("Us with Italy"), an Italian political party
 Nuclear Cities Initiative